The Pandanet Go European Cup was a Go competition played across Europe.  The now defunct European Cup and European Go Tour (which both ended in April 2007) merged to form this cup after Toyota's support of the Tour ended.  Many of the games played during the Cup are broadcast on Pandanet's Internet Go Server (IGS) and the KGS Go Server.
Since 2011, Pandanet decided to end the support of this competition and wanted to take care of the European Go Teams Championship.
This competition is called now European Go Cup as previously.

Format
The Pandanet Go European Cup consists of a series of events spread out across Europe.  These events fall into one of five levels (two carried over from the European Cup and three from the Tour).  Each event awards points to the top players based on both the event's level and the place earned by the player.  In the bottom two levels these points are purchased by the tournament holder and at the upper three levels, Pandanet purchases points.  Each point is equivalent to €6 (≈$8.25 US$).  Players can carry a maximum of 100 points into the finals.

Though there are twelve upper-level (levels 3, 4, and 5) events held every year, the number of lower-level (levels 1 or 2) events can vary with the sole restriction that there may not be more than two events at any level, per country, per year.  Because of this, the prize money has the ability to change from year to year.  With the guaranteed twelve Pandanet events, the overall prize money is at least €4,500, with more events resulting in more money offered.  This purse is split amongst the top twelve overall players based on position.

Level 1 – Tournament
These events are entirely funded by the holder and any sponsor they can secure on their own.  Prizes beyond awarding points must also be provided by the tournament holder.  Tournaments are not required to broadcast games via Pandanet but may do so if they wish.  These events are also the only ones that may be held at the same time as a higher-level event.  Tournaments award their 25 points (€150, ≈$206.49 USD) to the top six based on place.

Level 2 – Super Tournament
As with level 1 tournaments, a Super Tournament gets no funding from Pandanet.  The biggest difference between levels 1 and 2 are the points awarded—a Super Tournament gives out 50 points (€300, ≈$412.98 USD).  Furthermore, Super Tournaments offer points for the top eight as opposed to only six in a level 1 tournament.

Level 3 – Pandanet Super Tournament
Pandanet Super Tournaments are a lot like regular Super Tournaments, both give out the same number of points to the top eight players.  At level 3, however, funding is provided by Pandanet.  Pandanet also provides prize money for the top three in each level 3 event.  Seven Pandanet Super Tournaments are played each year.

Level 4 – Pandanet Major Tournament
Pandanet Major Tournaments are held only four times out of the year.  Like the Pandanet Supers, Major Tournaments are funded by Pandanet and have additional monetary prizes provided by them as well.  Furthermore, an additional budget is provided to pay for European go professionals (or 7-dan amateurs) to teach at the event.  Major tournaments award 75 points (€450, ≈$606.87 USD), split up between the top ten players.

Level 5 – Pandanet Finals
The last event of the Cup, the Pandanet Finals are held in Paris, France.  At least two games from each round are broadcast on Pandanet.  This event awards 100 points (€600, ≈$809.16 USD) to the top twelve finishers.

Prizes and points awarded

1st Pandanet Go European Cup Locations

†The status of this event is provisional

See also 
 European Go players
 European Go Championship
 European Youth Go Championship
 European Pair Go Championship

External links
Official Pandanet Go European Cup mini-site
IGS Pandanet Official Site

Go competitions in Europe
2007 establishments in Europe